Darrell Brock Jr. is a Kentucky businessman and former Republican official.

In April 2005, Brock was selected as chairman of the Republican Party of Kentucky. Brock resigned as chairman of the Republican Party of Kentucky in March 2007 to join DTX Oil as president and CEO.

During his tenure as chairman of the Republican Party of Kentucky, Brock was indicted for "conspiring to hire and fire employees based on their political views in violation of the state Merit System" while serving as commissioner of the  Kentucky Department of Local Government. Brock was subsequently included in a blanket pardon granted by Governor Ernie Fletcher.

Brock served Governor Fletcher in a dual capacity as commissioner of the Governor's Office for Local Development (GOLD) and assistant to the governor for Public Policy.  In these roles, Brock was responsible for federal and state grants, local governments and all constituent outreach offices.

Prior to his appointment, Brock worked as senior executive for Total Interior Systems, a Toyota Group Company located in Evansville, Indiana, where he was responsible for sales, purchasing and business development in North America as well as all expansion business in South America and Europe.

Before Toyota, Brock worked for Johnson Controls in Georgetown, Kentucky, where he focused on bringing service businesses to Kentucky. Brock was also involved in several start-up operations adding jobs to Kentucky.

Brock served on numerous boards, including Renaissance Kentucky, The Kentucky Housing Corporation, The Kentucky Infrastructure Authority, the Delta Regional Authority and the Appalachian Regional Commission. Brock was also a 2005 member of Leadership Kentucky, a statewide leadership development program.

References

Living people
Kentucky Republicans
Year of birth missing (living people)